Warrior Queen is a British television series made by Thames Television for ITV that was broadcast from 20 February to 27 March 1978.

Set in Britain under Roman rule, this historical drama starred Siân Phillips in the title role as Boudica, queen of the Iceni and chronicled her efforts to maintain the peace for her people and fight the Romans. Nigel Hawthorne played the Roman procurator (financial administrator and tax collector) Catus Decianus.

Cast

 Sian Phillips as Boudica
 Nigel Hawthorne as Caius Decianus
 Michael Gothard as Volthan
 Patti Love as Tasca
 Veronica Roberts as Camora
 Tony Haygarth as Moticcus
 Darien Angadi as Kuno

DVD release

The complete series of Warrior Queen is available on DVD in the UK.

External links
 

Fiction set in Roman Britain
ITV television dramas
1970s British drama television series
Television series set in ancient history
Television series by Fremantle (company)
Television shows produced by Thames Television
English-language television shows
Cultural depictions of Boudica
Television series set in the Roman Empire